Microcarbo is a genus of fish-eating birds, known as cormorants, of the family Phalacrocoracidae. The genus was formerly subsumed within Phalacrocorax.

Microcarbo has been recognized as a valid genus by the IOC's World Bird List on the basis of work by Siegel-Causey (1988), Kennedy et al. (2000), and Christidis and Boles (2008).

As suggested by the name, this genus contains the smallest of the world's cormorants. It is also the most basal, having diverged from the rest of the family between 12.8 to 15.4 million years ago.

Taxonomy
The genus Microcarbo was introduced in 1856 by the French naturalist Charles Lucien Bonaparte with the pygmy cormorant as the type species. The name combines the Ancient Greek mikros meaning "small" with the genus name Carbo that was introduced by Bernard Germain de Lacépède in 1789.

The genus contains five species.

List of species

†Serventys' cormorant, Microcarbo serventyorum

References

Christidis, L., and W. E. Boles. 2008. Systematics and taxonomy of Australian birds. CSIRO Publishing, Collingwood, Victoria, Australia.
Kennedy, M., R. D. Gray, and H. G. Spencer. 2000. The phylogenetic relationships of the shags and cormorants: can sequence data resolve a disagreement between behavior and morphology? Molecular Phylogenetics and Evolution 17: 345–359.
Siegel-Causey, D. 1988. Phylogeny of the Phalacrocoracidae. Condor 90: 885–905.

 
Bird genera
Taxa named by Charles Lucien Bonaparte